The Dent de Combette (2,082 m) is a mountain of the western Bernese Alps, located north of Rougemont in the Swiss canton of Vaud. It lies south of the border with the canton of Fribourg, on the chain culminating at the Dent de Savigny.

A secondary summit on the south side of the mountain (2,026 m) is named Rochers des Rayes.

References

External links
 Dent de Combette on Hikr
 Rochers des Rayes on Hikr

Mountains of the Alps
Mountains of Switzerland
Mountains of the canton of Vaud